Tom Durkin is an American soccer coach.

Playing career
He played for Loyola University Maryland before playing in the amateur level, competing in state leagues and cups.

Managerial career
Durkin served as head coach for FC Celtic Bolts, Bradenton Academics, Union County College, Richland College and Rutgers University. He also was an assistant manager for United States U–17 national team and the now defunct Tampa Bay Mutiny.

On September 3, 2013, he replaced Lisa Cole and interim manager Cat Whitehill as the manager of the Boston Breakers, after serving for them as an assistant for the last two matches of the 2013 National Women's Soccer League.

Personal life
He graduated from Kent State University. He resides in Dover, Massachusetts with his wife Elizabeth, and their three children Joe, George and Ava.

References

External links
 Durkin hired as Mutiny assistant

Living people
National Women's Soccer League coaches
American soccer coaches
American women's soccer coaches
Boston Breakers coaches
Year of birth missing (living people)
Boston Breakers non-playing staff